Neyyassery is a village in Karimannoor Panchayat in Thodupuzha Taluk of Idukki district in the Indian state of Kerala. Its registered population was 7,557 according to the 2011 census report, compared to the 2001 population of 7,610; the village population decreased somewhat in that decade. Most of the population is engaged in farming and rubber cultivation fostered by its fertile soil and low-pollution environment. Foreign remittances are one of the main sources of income for people in Neyyassery. 

Nearby towns and villages are Kothamangalam, Karimannoor, Thodupuzha, Udumbannoor, Muthalakodam, Vannappuram, Kaliyar, Thommankuthu, Vandamattam, and Kalloorkkad.

Demographics
 India census, Neyyassery had a population of 7,610: 3,829 males and 3,781 females.

See also
Karimannoor
St. Sebastian's church
Thodupuzha

References

External links
Planning board report

Villages in Idukki district